Karin Margareta Glenmark (born 8 April 1952) is a Swedish pop and rock singer. She is the niece to Bruno Glenmark and sister to Anders Glenmark. Together with Anders, she is a part of the siblings duo Gemini, and together with uncle Bruno and his wife Ann-Louise Hanson, they formed the group Glenmarks.

She has participated in Melodifestivalen five times. Together with Glenmarks in 1973 with the song En liten sång som alla andra (finished joint 4th), I annorlunda land (8th) 1974, and Lady Antoinette (6th place) 1975. In 1983 she took part alone with the song Se (3rd place), and in 1984 together with the brother Anders, with the song Kall som is (4th place). The following year, Karin and Anders took the Gemini name, as suggested by Björn Ulvaeus of ABBA (who, together with Benny Andersson, co-produced Gemini's two albums). The 1996 release was produced by Michael Saxell who also composed all the songs. Swedish poet Jacques Werup wrote the lyrics.

Karin has three children: Lisa, Nils and Anton. Nils Tull is active in the music industry, singing in the band Hoffmaestro.

Albums
1996 – Karin Glenmark
1984 – Mitt innersta rum

Singles
1984 – Kall som is (with Anders Glenmark)
1983 – Se
1974 – Hur går det till (with Anders Glenmark)

References

Swedish pop singers
Swedish rock singers
Melodifestivalen contestants
1952 births
Living people